Gaza compta is a species of sea snail, a marine gastropod mollusk in the family Margaritidae.

Description
The size of the shell varies between 23 mm and 28 mm. The pale beige shell has a weak spiral sculpture. But the first two whorls of the teleoconch have a purple color and they show some marked axial undulations.

Distribution
This species occurs in the Atlantic Ocean off Southeast Brazil at depths between 700 m and 800 m.

References

  Luiz Ricardo L. Simone & Carlo M. Cunha, Revision of genera Gaza and Callogaza (Vetigastropoda, Trochidae), with description of a new Brazilian species; Zootaxa1318: 1–40 (2006)

External links
 

compta
Gastropods described in 2006